Norbert Ágh (born 5 February 1970) is a Hungarian swimmer. He competed in two events at the 1988 Summer Olympics.

References

1970 births
Living people
Hungarian male swimmers
Olympic swimmers of Hungary
Swimmers at the 1988 Summer Olympics
Sportspeople from Dunaújváros